Flint is a masculine given name. It may refer to:

 Flint Dille (born 1955), American screenwriter, game designer and novelist
 Flint Fleming (born 1965), American former Arena Football League player
 Flint Hanner (1898–1973), American multi-sport track and field athlete and coach
 Flint Gregory Hunt (1959–1997), American murderer
 Flint Rasmussen (born 1968), American rodeo clown
 Flint Rhem (1901–1969), American Major League Baseball pitcher

Masculine given names
English masculine given names